Michael Jenkins (born 9 June 1972) is a former professional rugby league footballer who played in the 1990s and 2000s. A Wales international forward, Jenkins played at club level for the Newcastle Knights, Workington Town, Gateshead Thunder and Hull F.C.

Early life
Jenkins was born in Gold Coast, Queensland, Australia.

Club career
He was signed by Workington Town having only gone to the United Kingdom to accompany close friend Evan Cochrane who had signed for Workington Town. After half a season playing at Workington Town, an offer was received from Super League club Gateshead Thunder. After signing with the Gateshead Thunder, Workington Town received a £15,000 transfer fee.

International honours
Jenkins made his international début for Wales in 2000 against South Africa. Playing at Hooker, Jenkins scored two tries in the 40-12 win.

Jenkins further represented Wales at the 2000 Rugby League World Cup scoring a try in the 38-6 victory over Cook Islands.

References

External links
Woodsy's Winners and Losers: Hull
Wigan hold off battling Hull
Kumuls unchanged for Wales
The Australian civil war
Wales looking good
Wales v Cook Islands preview
Saints hold Wales' World Cup hopes

1972 births
Living people
Gateshead Thunder (1999) players
Hull F.C. players
Newcastle Knights players
Rugby league hookers
Rugby league props
Rugby league second-rows
Wales national rugby league team players
Australian rugby league players
Rugby league players from Gold Coast, Queensland
Workington Town players